The 2012–13 Nemzeti Bajnokság III is Hungary's third-level football competition.

Standings

Alföld

Bakony

See also
 2012–13 Magyar Kupa
 2012–13 Nemzeti Bajnokság I
 2012–13 Nemzeti Bajnokság II

References

External links
  
  

Nemzeti Bajnokság III seasons
2012–13 in Hungarian football
Hun